Flash powder is a pyrotechnic composition, a mixture of oxidizer and metallic fuel, which burns quickly and produces a loud noise regardless of confinement. It is widely used in theatrical pyrotechnics and fireworks (namely salutes, e.g., cherry bombs, M-80s, firecrackers, and cap gun shots) and was once used for flashes in photography.

Different varieties of flash powder are made from different compositions; most common are potassium perchlorate and aluminium powder. Sometimes, sulfur is included in the mixture to increase the sensitivity. Early formulations used potassium chlorate instead of potassium perchlorate.

Flash powder compositions are also used in military pyrotechnics when production of large amount of noise, light, or infrared radiation is required, e.g., missile decoy flares and stun grenades.

History

Lycopodium powder is a yellow-tan dust-like powder historically used as a flash powder. Today, the principal use of the powder is to create flashes or flames that are large and impressive but relatively easy to manage safely in magic acts and for cinema and theatrical special effects.

Mixtures

Normally, flash powder mixtures are compounded to achieve a particular purpose.  These mixtures range from extremely fast-burning mixtures designed to produce a maximum audio report, to mixtures designed to burn slowly and provide large amounts of illumination, to mixtures that were formerly used in photography.

Aluminium and chlorate
The combination of aluminium powder and potassium chlorate is unstable, and a poor choice for flash powder that is to be stored for more than a very short period.  For that reason, it has been largely replaced by the potassium perchlorate mixtures.  Chlorate mixes are still used when cost is the overriding concern because potassium chlorate is less expensive than perchlorate.  

The simplest is a two-component chlorate mix, although this is rarely used.
KClO3 +  2Al → Al2O3 + KCl

The composition is approximately 70% KClO3 : 30% Al by weight for the reactants of the above stoichiometrically balanced equation.

It is considered critically important to exclude sulfur and any acidic components from these mixtures. Sulfur oxidises and absorbs moisture to produce sulfuric and thionic acids; any acid in the mixture makes it unstable. Sometimes a few percent of bicarbonate or carbonate buffer is added to the mixture to ensure the absence of acidic impurities.

Sulfur is deliberately added as a third component to this mixture in order to reduce the activation energy. However this gives the problem with acid production and instability and so these mixtures are generally considered too unstable to be stored and must be mixed immediately before use. Antimony trisulfide may be used as an alternative, and is more stable in storage.

Potassium nitrate, aluminium and sulfur
This composition, usually in a ratio of 5 parts potassium nitrate, to 3 parts aluminum powder, to 2 parts sulfur, is especially popular with hobbyists. It is not very quick-burning unless exceptionally fine ingredients are used. Although it incorporates sulfur, it is in fact fairly stable, sustaining multiple hits from a hammer onto a hard surface. Adding 2% of its weight with boric acid is reputed to significantly increase stability and shelf life, through resistance to dampening through ambient humidity. Other ratios such as 6 KNO3/3 Al/2 S and 5 KNO3/2 Al/3 S also exist and work. All ratios have similar burn times and strength, although 5 KNO3/3 Al/2 S seems to be dominant.

2 KNO3 + 4 Al + S → K2S + N2 + 2 Al2O3

The composition is approximately 59% KNO3 : 31.6% Al : 9.4% S by weight for the reactants of the above stoichiometrically balanced equation.

For best results, "German Dark" aluminum should be used, with air float sulfur, and finely ball-milled pure potassium nitrate. The finished mixture should never be ball milled together.

Aluminium and perchlorate
Aluminium powder and potassium perchlorate are the only two components of the pyrotechnic industry standard flash powder. It provides a great balance of stability and power, and is the composition used in most commercial exploding fireworks.

aka A B mixture

The balanced equation for the reaction is:

3 KClO4 + 8 Al → 3 KCl + 4 Al2O3

The stoichiometric ratio is 34.2% aluminum and 65.8% perchlorate by mass.
A ratio of seven parts potassium perchlorate to three parts dark pyro aluminium is the composition used by most pyrotechnicians. 

For best results, the aluminium powder should be "Dark Pyro" grade, with a flake particle shape, and a particle size of fewer than 10 micrometres.  The KClO4 should be in powder form, free from clumps. It can be sieved through a screen, if necessary, to remove any clumps prior to use. The particle size of the perchlorate is not as critical as that of the aluminium component, as much less energy is required to decompose the KClO4 than is needed to melt the aluminium into the liquid state required for the reaction.

Although this composition is fairly insensitive, it should be treated with care and respect.  Hobbyist pyrotechnicians usually use a method called diapering, in which the materials are poured separately onto a large piece of paper, which is then alternately lifted at each corner to roll the composition over itself and mix the components. Some amateur pyrotechnicians choose to mix the composition by shaking in a closed paper container, as this is much quicker and more effective than diapering. One method of mixing flash is to put the components in the final device and handling the device will mix the flash powder.  Paper/cardboard is chosen over other materials, such as plastic, as a result of its favorable triboelectric properties.

Large quantities should never be mixed in a single batch. Large quantities are not only more difficult to handle safely, but they place innocent bystanders within the area at risk. In the event of accidental ignition, debris from a multiple-pound flash powder explosion can be thrown hundreds of feet with sufficient force to kill or injure.  (Note: 3 grams of mixture is enough to explode in open air without constraint other than air pressure.)

No matter the quantity, care must always be taken to prevent any electrostatic discharge or friction during mixing or handling, as these may cause accidental ignition.

Magnesium and nitrate
Another flash composition common among amateurs consists of magnesium powder and potassium nitrate. Other metal nitrates have been used, including barium and strontium nitrates.  Compositions using nitrate and magnesium metal have been used as photographic flash powders almost since the invention of photography. Potassium nitrate/magnesium flash powder should be mixed and used immediately and not stored due to its tendency of self-ignition.

If magnesium isn't a very fine powder it can be passivated with linseed oil or potassium dichromate. The passivated magnesium flash powder is stable and safe to store.

2 KNO3 + 5 Mg → K2O + N2 + 5 MgO
The composition is 62.5% KNO3 : 37.5% Mg by weight for the reactants of the above stoichiometrically balanced equation. Below is the same reaction but involving barium nitrate.

Ba(NO3)2 + 5 Mg → BaO + N2 + 5 MgO

Mixtures designed to make reports are substantially different from mixtures designed for illumination.  A stoichiometric ratio of three parts KNO3 to two parts Mg is close to ideal and provides the most rapid burn. The magnesium powder should be smaller than 200 mesh, though up to 100 mesh will work. The potassium nitrate should be impalpable dust.  This mixture is popular in amateur pyrotechnics because it is insensitive and relatively safe as such things go.

For photographic use, mixtures containing magnesium and nitrates are made much more fuel rich.  The excess magnesium is volatilized by the reaction and burns in air providing additional light.  In addition, the higher concentration of fuel results in a slower burn, providing more of a "poof" and less of a "bang" when ignited.  A formula from 1917 specifies 5 parts of magnesium to 6 parts of barium nitrate for a stoichiometry of nine parts fuel to one part oxidizer.  Modern recreations of photographic flash powders may avoid the use of barium salts because of their toxic nature.  A mixture of five parts 80 mesh magnesium to one part of potassium nitrate provides a good white flash without being too violent. Fuel rich flash powders are also used in theatrical flash pots.

Magnesium based compositions degrade over long periods, meaning the metallic Mg will slowly react with atmospheric oxygen and moisture. In military pyrotechnics involving magnesium fuels, external oxygen can be excluded by using hermetically sealed canisters.  Commercial photographic flash powders are sold as two-part mixtures, to be combined immediately before use.

Magnesium and PTFE 
A flash composition designed specifically to generate flares that are exceptionally bright in the infrared portion of the spectrum use a mixture of pyro-grade magnesium and powdered polytetrafluoroethylene.  These flares are used as decoys from aircraft that might be subject to heat-seeking missile fire.

2n Mg + (C2F4))n → 2n MgF2 (s) + 2n C (s)

Antimony trisulfide and chlorate 
This mixture, and similar mixtures sometimes containing pyro aluminium have been used since the early 1900s for small "Black Cat" style paper firecrackers. Its extremely low cost makes it popular among manufacturers of low-grade fireworks in China. Like all mixtures containing chlorates, it is extremely sensitive to friction, impact and ESD, and is considered unsafe in pyrotechnic devices that contain more than a few tens of milligrams of the mixture.

3 KClO3 + Sb2S3 → Sb2O3 + 3 SO2 + 3 KCl

This mixture is not highly energetic, and in at least some parts of the United States, firecrackers containing 50 mg or less of this mixture are legal as consumer fireworks.

Safety and handling
Flash powders even within intended usages often release explosive force of deadly capacity.  Nearly all widely used flash powder mixtures are sensitive to shock, friction and electrostatic discharge. In certain mixtures, it is not uncommon for this sensitivity to spontaneously change over time, or due to change in the environment, or to other unknowable factors in either the original manufacturing or in real-world storage. Additionally, accidental contaminants such as strong acids or sulfur compounds can sensitise them even more. Because flash powder mixtures are so easy to initiate, there is potentially a high risk of accidental explosions which can inflict severe blast/fragmentation injuries, e.g. blindness, explosive amputation, permanent maiming, or disfigurement. Fatalities have occurred. The various flash powder compositions should therefore not be handled by anyone who is unfamiliar with their properties, or the handling techniques required to maintain safety. Flash powder and flash powder devices pose exceptionally high risks to children, who typically cannot understand the danger and may be less adept with safe handling techniques. As a result, children tend to suffer more severe injuries than adults.

Flash powders—especially those that use chlorate—are often highly sensitive to friction, heat/flame and static electricity. A spark of as little as 0.1–10 millijoules can set off certain mixtures.  Certain formulations prominent in the underground press contain both sulfur and potassium chlorate. These mixtures are especially shock and friction sensitive and in many applications should be considered unpredictable.  Modern pyrotechnic practices call for never using sulfur in a mix containing chlorate salts.

Some flash powder formulations (those that use single-digit micrometre flake aluminium powder or fine magnesium powder as their fuel) can self-confine and explode in small quantities. This makes flash powder dangerous to handle, as it can cause severe hearing damage and amputation injury even when sitting in the open. Self-confinement occurs when the mass of the pile provides sufficient inertia to allow high pressure to build within it as the mixture reacts. This is referred to as 'inertial confinement', and it is not to be confused with a detonation.

Flash powder of any formulation should not be mixed in large quantities by amateur pyrotechnicians. Beginners should start with sub-gram quantities, and refrain from making large devices. Flash powder should only be made at the site at which it will be used. Additionally, the mixture should be made immediately before use.  When mixed, the transportation, storage, usage, various possession, and illegal "firearms" laws (including felonies) may come into effect that do not apply to the unmixed or pre-assembled components.

See also 

 Pyrotechnic initiator
 Sprengel explosive
 Thermite
 Black powder
 Lycopodium powder

References 

Explosives
Pyrotechnic compositions
Powders